The 2006 Tel Aviv shawarma restaurant bombing was a suicide bombing  on April 17, 2006 at "Rosh Ha'ir" shawarma restaurant in Tel Aviv, Israel. Eleven Israeli civilians were killed in the attack and 70 were injured. The Palestinian militant organization Islamic Jihad claimed responsibility for the terror attack.

Attack
On April 17, 2006, around 1:30 pm, a Palestinian suicide bomber approached a crowded fast food restaurant near the old Tel Aviv Central Bus Station in the southern part of the Neve Shaanan neighborhood. The suicide bomber blew himself up when the security guard stationed at the entrance to the restaurant asked him to open his bag for inspection.

The blast killed 11 people and injured more than 70. Two of the victims died on arrival at Ichilov Hospital in Tel Aviv. Of the wounded, six were seriously hurt, 12 sustained moderate wounds, while the rest were lightly injured.

Perpetrators 
The Palestinian Islamic Jihad claimed responsibility for the attack and identified the bomber as Sami Salim Hamad from near Jenin in northern West Bank. Islamic Jihad leader Elias Ashkar, who was accused of being behind the suicide attack, was killed by Israeli troops in the village of Qabatiya, together with other four Palestinians, on May 14, 2006.

Official reactions 
Involved parties

 Israeli Foreign Ministry spokesman Gideon Meir stated that Israel held Hamas responsible for the attacks, accusing the Hamas of "giving support to all the other terrorist organizations".

:
 Hamas, which won the Palestinian general elections on 25 January 2006, refused to condemn the attack, and instead described the attack as an act of self-defense.
 Khaled Abu Helal, spokesman for the Hamas-led Interior Ministry, called the attack "a direct result of the policy of the occupation and the brutal aggression and siege committed against our people."

International
 : The Bush administration strongly criticized the attacks, calling it "a despicable act of terror for which there is no excuse or justification."

U.S. Court ruling on case
The family of Daniel Wultz won a case in May 2012 in a U.S. District Court against Iran and Syria for their supporting "Palestinian militants" in this suicide bombing attack. The amount of the judgement was for $323,000,000 and represented the first time that a U.S. court issued a judgment against Syria for terror related activities.

See also 
 2002 Herzliya shawarma restaurant bombing

References

External links

Suicide bombing at "Rosh Ha'ir" shawarma restaurant in Tel Aviv - published at the Israeli Ministry of Foreign Affairs
 Palestinian bomber was 21-year-old dropout - published on USA Today on April 17, 2006.
 Suicide bomber kills nine in Tel Aviv - published on MSNBC on April 17, 2006.
 9 killed in Tel Aviv blast - published on Ynetnews on April 17, 2006.

Suicide bombings in 2006
Attacks on restaurants in Asia
Mass murder in 2006
Suicide bombing in the Israeli–Palestinian conflict
Terrorist incidents in Israel in 2006
Second Intifada
Terrorist attacks attributed to Palestinian militant groups
2006 Tel Aviv shawarma restaurant bombing
2000s crimes in Tel Aviv
April 2006 events in Asia
Building bombings in Israel
Islamic terrorism in Israel